Stein Erik Lunde (born 22 November 1953) is a Norwegian novelist, children's writer, biographer and textbook writer.

Lunde made his literary debut in 1982 with the crime novel Ingenting ruster. He was awarded the Brage Prize in 1998 for the children's books Eggg. Among his later books are Ulv from 2004, En far from 2006, and Eg kan ikkje sove no from 2008.

In addition to being an author, Lunde also writes lyrics and has translated Bob Dylan into Norwegian.

References

External links
 

1953 births
Living people
20th-century Norwegian novelists
21st-century Norwegian novelists
Norwegian children's writers
Norwegian crime fiction writers
Norwegian biographers
Male biographers
Date of birth missing (living people)
Place of birth missing (living people)
Norwegian male novelists
20th-century Norwegian male writers
21st-century Norwegian male writers